Williamstown Independent School District (WISD) is an independent school district located in the town of Williamstown, Kentucky, United States. The district consists of four schools, a headstart/preschool, an elementary school, a middle school, and a high school. All of the schools are in the same building at the same location.  The district has been nominated as a top 5% school in the state of Kentucky.

Extracurriculars include basketball, baseball, volleyball, soccer, Academic team, golf, FCCLA, FFA, Yearbook, and many clubs.

Administration

Board of Education 
The WISD is governed by five-member duly-elected Board of Education. Members of the BOE in 2020 included:

Schools 
 Williamstown Elementary Schools 
 Williamstown Junior High School
 Williamstown Senior High School
 Williamstown Head Start / Preschool

References

External links

School districts in Kentucky
School districts established in 1890
1890 establishments in Kentucky